Nicolaas "Klaas" Buchly (26 January 1910 – 19 May 1965) was a Dutch track cyclist. He competed at the 1948 Summer Olympics in the 2 km tandem sprint, together with Tinus van Gelder, and finished in fifth place.

See also
 List of Dutch Olympic cyclists

References

1910 births
1965 deaths
Olympic cyclists of the Netherlands
Cyclists at the 1948 Summer Olympics
Dutch male cyclists
Cyclists from The Hague
20th-century Dutch people